Raiamas intermedius is a species of ray-finned fish in the genus Raiamas which is found in the Democratic Republic of the Congo and Zambia.

References

 

Raiamas
Fish described in 1915
Taxobox binomials not recognized by IUCN 

es:Labeobarbus intermedius